"Beauty and the Beasts" is the fourth episode of season three of the horror-drama television show Buffy the Vampire Slayer. It was written by Marti Noxon, directed by James Whitmore, Jr., and first broadcast on October 20, 1998.

When a boy is found mauled to death on the nights surrounding the full moon Oz is suspected. Buffy has to deal with the fact that Angel is back from Hell, broken and animalistic.

Plot

The day of a full moon, Xander and Giles learn about a brutal murder in the woods the night before. They discover that Xander had slept through his watch of the werewolf Oz, and that the window in the pen is open.

Buffy begins to open up about her life to Mr. Platt, the school psychologist. On patrol that night, Angel attacks her in the woods. Animalistic, he is no match for Buffy, who chains him up in the mansion. She sees the spot on the floor where she left his ring; it was scorched by Angel's body on his return. Willow, Xander and Cordelia enter the morgue to collect hair samples from the body of the mauled boy.

Buffy tells Giles that she had a vivid dream of Angel coming back. Giles explains that time passes differently in demonic dimensions, so any being who manages to return would most likely have been turned into a monster. Buffy wonders if Angel was responsible for the murder; the hair samples were inconclusive. She returns to Platt's office to pour her heart out, then realizes that he has been mauled to death.

When Pete and Debbie sneak into a room to make out, Pete discovers that one of his jars has been emptied and accuses Debbie of drinking its contents.
Pete yells at Debbie, then transforms into a monster. He tells her that he used to need the substance to turn into the monster, but now only needs to get mad. He begins beating Debbie, blaming her for making him mad. As he transforms back into his human form, she forgives him.

Oz is no longer suspected, as Platt was killed during the day. He meets up with Debbie and notices her black eye. Buffy and Willow seek out Debbie, and try in vain to talk sense into her. Meanwhile, Angel breaks free from his shackles, and Pete finds Oz in the library. Pete turns into a monster and starts to beat up Oz for talking to Debbie. The sun sets and the tables are turned when Oz transforms into his werewolf form, Oz becoming evenly matched in strength and begins fighting Pete. Buffy tries to tranquilize Oz, but Debbie pushes the gun away and Buffy ends up shooting Giles. Buffy chases after Pete while Willow and Faith pursue Oz.

After a struggle, Faith sedates Oz with a dart. Buffy follows Pete's blood trail, but he finds Debbie first and despite her pleas and  attempts to appease him, he kills her. Buffy finds Pete, but he knocks her to the ground and advances threateningly on her. Angel arrives and he and Pete begin fighting; Angel uses the chains that still bind his wrists to kill Pete. Afterwards, he reverts to his human face and calls out Buffy's name before falling to his knees and embracing her in tears. Buffy begins to cry as well, finally accepting that Angel is back.

Writing

According to Erin Waggoner, "Beauty and the Beasts" is an example of a Buffy episode that condemns aggressive masculinity. It shows a male student hoping to appear more virile by using a potion, resulting in a Jekyll and Hyde-style change of character and the physical and verbal abuse of his girlfriend.

References

External links 

 

Buffy the Vampire Slayer (season 3) episodes
1998 American television episodes
Television episodes about werewolves
Television episodes about drugs
Television episodes about violence against women
Television episodes written by Marti Noxon